Antonie Galušková (born 17 May 2001) is a Czech slalom canoeist who has competed at the international level since 2016.

She won a silver medal in the K1 team event at the 2021 World Championships in Bratislava. She also won a gold and a bronze medal in the same event at the European Championships. She is the 2022 U23 European Champion (K1) and the Czech Champion 2022 (K1)

References

External links

Living people
Czech female canoeists
2001 births
Medalists at the ICF Canoe Slalom World Championships
People from Strakonice
Sportspeople from the South Bohemian Region
21st-century Czech women